Jackson Mwanza (born 6 February 1987) is a Zambian professional footballer who currently plays as a forward.

Honours 
ZESCO United
Winner
 Zambian Premier League: 2014

Runner-up
 Zambian Premier League: 2013

External links 
 

1987 births
Living people
Zambian footballers
Zambia international footballers
2015 Africa Cup of Nations players
ZESCO United F.C. players
Association football forwards